Daniel Shek is a former Israeli diplomat who served as Ambassador to France (September 2006-December 2010) and Consulate General to the Pacific Northwest of the US based in San Francisco. He is a member of the Kadima party.

Biography
Shek was born in Jerusalem on June 16, 1955, to Zeev Shek, also an ambassador and his mother, Alisa Ehrmann-Shek, am artist He attended Hebrew University of Jerusalem, studying general history and French literature, after serving in the military. When he graduated, he married his girlfriend Marie who was born in Tunisia. Shek is now married to Emilie Moatti, a Knesset member he met while Ambassador.

At Mitvim, he is a member of the Board of directors.

Shek was also managing director at BICOM (Britain Israel Communications and Research Centre).

References

Living people
Kadima politicians
1955 births
Israeli consuls
Ambassadors of Israel to France
Hebrew University of Jerusalem alumni